Kilden Teater is a Norwegian theatre based in Kristiansand. It was established in 1991, and has been the regional theatre for Agder since 1995. It was earlier named Agder Teater, but changed its name after moving in to the new Kilden Performing Arts Centre.

Its first theatre director was Bentein Baardson, who led the theatre from 1991 to 1994. Alex Scherpf has been theatre director since 2005.

References

Theatres in Kristiansand
Buildings and structures in Kristiansand
Culture in Agder
Tourist attractions in Kristiansand
Theatres completed in 1991
1991 establishments in Norway